Gokuldham High School & Jr. College was founded on 2 July 1983 in India. The school has a multi-story structure with more than 5,000 students and 200 staff members. It is designed to accommodate a volume of 3,688 students. The school is affiliated with the Indian Certificate of Secondary Education (ICSE) board.

Infrastructure

Building
The school building has five stories with 44 classrooms. The school has 5 halls for artists, and laboratories for physics, chemistry, and biology. There are two computer laboratories with adequate computers to serve the entire school. The school auditorium is a hall fitted with a sound system to conduct seminars, conferences, and other co-curricular activities.

Playground
Students can play games like football, handball, hockey, and cricket on the playground (which is the bus parking area). Handball, football, basketball, and hockey are included in the physical education (PE) classes of the school. The students can choose any one of these four sports to train for.

Library
It contains about 22,184 books, periodicals, and magazines suitable for school students.

Additional facilities
The school campus houses a swimming pool where students can train for aquatic competitions. A wide range of hobby classes are conducted over weekends. However, swimming classes are not included in the extracurricular syllabus of the school.

Management
Gokuldham High School management:

Secondary section

Principal 
Jayshree Narayanan

Vice-Principal

Supervisors

Primary Section

Principal
Jayshree Narayanan

Head Teacher
Ashwini Parulekar

Supervisors
Fernandes	Anita	
Eti Rohatgi
Kajal Sharma	
Irene Chettiar

Junior college

Principal
Jayshree Narayanan

Admission process
The academic session of the school is from March to April. The admission process begins in mid-March, and the admission procedure is done in the first week of May. The admission process is one and the same for all students and is purely on a merit basis against vacancies available for each standard.

Academic promotion rules

References

High schools and secondary schools in Maharashtra
Educational institutions established in 1983
Private schools in Mumbai
High schools and secondary schools in Mumbai
1983 establishments in Maharashtra